Bachir Ammoury (born January 29, 1983 in Detroit, Michigan) is a Lebanese professional basketball player currently playing for Sagesse in the Lebanese Basketball League. He was also represented the Lebanon national basketball team that participated in the 2013 William Jones Cup in Chinese Taipei, after being called by coach Ghassan Sarkis to play as a local player. Bashir signed his first professional contract for the Lebanese ZZahle side Anibal Zahle along with brother Tarek. However, in 2014 Bachir encountered a promising deal from Tadamon Zouk in the 2014 season after the team had reached the Lebanese first division since the 1999.

Personal life
Bachir is also the brother of Tarek Ammoury who also plays in Tadamon Zouk.

References

External links 
 http://basketball.asia-basket.com/player/Bachir_Ammoury/Tadamon_Zouk/27432?AmNotSure=1

1983 births
Living people
Lebanese men's basketball players
Small forwards
Basketball players from Detroit
Lebanese people of American descent